

Events 
February 22 – Lovisa Augusti performs at a concert in Gothenburg directed by a musician of the Hovkapellet. 
September 11 – Eleven-year-old Wolfgang Amadeus Mozart, his father Leopold, his mother Anna Maria, and his older sister Nannerl) left Salzburg for Vienna, travelling via Melk (where young Wolfgang plays the organ).  A few weeks later, an outbreak of smallpox in Vienna causes them to flee the city, and they travel to Brno.
October 26 – Wolfgang Amadeus Mozart is diagnosed with smallpox.  He recovers by November 10, but Nannerl then contracts the disease; she also survives.
Dictionnaire de musique by Jean-Jacques Rousseau is published.
Wolfgang Amadeus Mozart composes the first act of an oratorio, Die Schuldigkeit des ersten Gebots, to be completed by Michael Haydn and Anton Cajetan Adlgasser.

Popular music 
 James Hook's first collection of songs for the Vauxhall Gardens.

Opera 
Felice Alessandri – Ezio
Michael Arne – Cymon
Christoph Willibald Gluck – Alceste
Johann Adam Hiller – Lottchen am Hofe
Wolfgang Amadeus Mozart – Apollo et Hyacinthus
Josef Mysliveček 
Il Bellerofonte
Farnace , ED.10:D5
Giovanni Paisiello – L'idolo cinese, R.1.10

Classical music 
Carl Friedrich Abel – 6 Symphonies, Op. 7
Thomas Arne – Four Symphonies
Luigi Boccherini – Symphony in D major, G.500
Joseph Haydn
Symphony No.35 in B-flat major, Hob.I:35
Symphony no 39
6 Flute Quartets, Op. 5 (Amsterdam: J. J. Hummel)
String Trio in E-flat major, Hob.V:4
Divertimento in C major, Hob.XIV:3
Divertimento in G major, Hob.XVI:11 (attribution in contest)
Divertimento in A major, Hob.XVI:12
Michael Haydn – Divertimento for 2 basset-horns, 2 horns and bassoon in C
Gabriele Leone – 6 Sonatas for mandolin and basso continuo, Book 1 opus 1
Antonio Lolli – 6 Violin Sonatas, Op. 3
Wolfgang Amadeus Mozart 
Die Schuldigkeit des ersten Gebotes, K.35
Piano Concerto No.1 in F major, K.37
Piano Concerto No.3 in D major, K.40
A Berenice, K.70/61c
Josef Mysliveček – 6 String Quartets, Op. 2
Giuseppe Paolucci – Preces octo vocibus concinendae in oratione quadraginta horarum
Antonio Sacchini – Sinfonia in D major
William Selby – 10 Voluntarys

Methods and music theory 

 Johann Daniel Berlin – Anleitung zur Tonometrie (Kopenhagen and Leipzig: Friedrich Christian Pelt)
 Johann Philipp Kirnberger – Der allezeit fertige Polonoisen- und Menuettencomponist (Berlin: George Ludewig Winter), a method for composing by throwing dice
 Johannes Schmidlin – Deutliche Anleitung zum gründlichen Singen der Psalmen (Zürich: Bürgkli)
 Granville Sharp – A Short Introduction to Vocal Musick
 Georg Andreas Sorge – Anleitung zur Fantasie

Births 
March 17 – Luigi Capotorti, Italian composer (died 1842)
March 19 – Leonhard von Call, Austrian composer (died 1815)
April 27 – Andreas Romberg, violinist and composer (died 1821)
May 4 – Tyagaraja – composer and singer (died 1848)
September 17 – Henri Montan Berton, composer, teacher and writer, son of Pierre Montan Berton (died 1844)
September 20 – José Maurício Nunes Garcia, composer (died 1830)
September 26 – Wenzel Müller, composer (died 1835)
November 13 – Bernhard Romberg, cellist and composer (died 1841)
December 8 – Fabre d'Olivet, French poet and composer (died 1825)
December 10 – Johannes Spech, Hungarian composer (died 1836)
December 13 – August Eberhard Müller, German composer (died 1817)
date unknown
Gottlieb Graupner, musician, composer, educator and publisher (died 1836)
Filip Višnjić, poet and guslar player (died 1834)
Luigi Zamboni, operatic bass-baritone (died 1837) 
probable
Lewis Lavenu, music seller and publisher (died 1818)

Deaths 
January 3 – Luca Antonio Predieri, composer (born 1688) 
April 7 – Franz Sparry, composer (born 1715)
June 22 – Johan Henrik Freithoff, violinist and composer (born 1713)
June 25 – Georg Philipp Telemann, composer (born 1681)
July 3 – Matthew Dubourg, violinist, conductor and composer (born 1707)
August 28 – Johann Schobert, harpsichordist and composer (b. c. 1720)
September 10 – Charles John Frederick Lampe, organist and composer (born 1739)

References

 
18th century in music
Music by year